Robert Dale Slocum is an American biologist and botanist. He is a professor of biology in the Center for Natural Sciences at Goucher College. His research focuses on plant physiology, molecular biology, and biotechnology.

Education 
Slocum completed a Bachelor of Arts at University of Maine. In 1977, Slocum earned a Master of Science from Ohio State University. His master's thesis was titled Effects of SO₂ and pH on the ultrastructure of the Trebouxia phycobiont of the pollution-sensitve lichen Parmelia caperata (L.) Ach. He earned a doctorate from University of Texas at Austin in 1981. His dissertation is titled Studies on the localization of phytochrome and calcium in light-and-gravity-stimulated plants.

Career 
Slocum researches the physiology of plants, adaptation to environmental stresses, nitrogen metabolism, and the molecular biology and biotechnology of plants. Slocum was a professor in the Department of Botany at Williams College. In 1991, he published Biochemistry and Physiology of Polyamines in Plants. Slocum joined the faculty at Goucher College in 1992. He is a Professor of Biology in the Center for Natural Sciences at Goucher. In 2005, Slocum received a 3-year grant for $340,000 from the National Science Foundation. With the grant, Slocum and Christopher T. Brown of the National Human Genome Research Institute conducted research on the regulation of pyrimidine metabolism in plants with a team of undergraduates. From 2011 to 2012, Slocum was a rotating program director of the National Science Foundation's Division of Integrative Organismal Systems.

Selected works

Books

Articles

References

External links
 

20th-century American botanists
20th-century American non-fiction writers
21st-century American botanists
21st-century American non-fiction writers
American physiologists
Goucher College faculty and staff
Living people
Ohio State University alumni
University of Maine alumni
University of Texas at Austin alumni
Williams College faculty
Year of birth missing (living people)